The Mahanavika Buddhagupta ("Great Navigator Buddhagupta") stone inscription, is a 5th-century CE Buddhist stone inscription found in the Wellesley Province, Penang, Malaysia. It was discovered in 1834 by Captain James Low, of the East India Company.

The plaque is in schist, 8–9 cm wide, and 66 cm high. It is today in the Indian Museum in Kolkata.

The plate features the illustration of a Buddhist stupa. The script is Brahmi from South India, and very similar to the 
script of the inscription of King Purnavarman. Buddhagupta declares in his inscription that he is from Raktamartikka, thought to be Rajbadidanga in Bengal.

The stele examplifies the links between India and Southeast Asia and that early time, as well as the link between trade and Buddhism.

Another inscription by Mahanavika Buddhagupta, the "Sungai Mas Buddhist stele", was found in Kampong Sungai Mas, Sungai Petani, Kedah, and dated to circa the 5th-6th century CE. It is now in the Muzium Arkeologi Lembah Bujang, Merbok, Malaysia.

See also
 Buddhism in Malaysia
 Bujang Valley

References

5th-century Buddhism
5th-century inscriptions
Buddhist inscriptions
Penang